Viidu is a village in Saaremaa Parish, Saare County in western Estonia.

Before the administrative reform in 2017, the village was in Lääne-Saare Parish.

Tallinn Botanic Garden's Audaku experimental station is located in Viidu.

One part of Viidu is called as Audaku. Saaremaa most highest place (Rauna Hill) is located in Audaku.

References

Villages in Saare County